Megamind is a 2010 American computer-animated superhero comedy film produced by DreamWorks Animation and Pacific Data Images and distributed by Paramount Pictures. Directed by Tom McGrath from a screenplay by Alan Schoolcraft and Brent Simons, the film stars the voices of Will Ferrell, Tina Fey, Jonah Hill, David Cross, and Brad Pitt. It tells the story of Megamind, a highly intelligent alien supervillain; after defeating his long-time nemesis Metro Man, Megamind creates a new hero to fight, but must act to save the city when his "creation" becomes an even worse villain than he was.

Megamind premiered in Russia on October 28, 2010, and was released in the United States in Digital 3D, IMAX 3D and 2D on November 5, 2010, and was met with generally positive reviews from critics. With a budget of $130 million, the film grossed over $321 million worldwide, becoming one of DreamWorks Animation's lowest-grossing CG animated films of the 2010s.

It later spawned a franchise including three games, and a short film, titled Megamind: The Button of Doom, which released on February 25, 2011, with the film's DVD and Blu-ray. A follow-up series, Megaminds Guide to Defending Your City, was announced in 2022 for Peacock.

Plot

Supervillain Megamind and his arch-nemesis, the superhero Metro Man, are both aliens who were sent to Earth as infants before their planets were sucked into a black hole. Though both land in Metro City at the same time, Metro Man is raised in a mansion, while Megamind is raised in a prison. He goes to the same school as Metro Man, who is well-liked by his classmates. Megamind is bullied by everyone until he concludes his purpose is to be a supervillain, setting off a rivalry between him and Metro Man. As an adult, Megamind, aided by his fish-like companion Minion, frequently and unsuccessfully battles Metro Man for control of the city.

At the grand opening of the new Metro Man Museum, Megamind escapes prison, kidnaps reporter Roxanne Ritchi, and lures Metro Man to an abandoned observatory to rescue her. Once there, Metro Man collapses, claiming the copper-lined observatory roof weakens his powers; Megamind then blasts Metro Man with a sun-powered death ray, apparently killing him. Overjoyed that he has finally won, Megamind takes over the city and goes on a crime spree. However, he eventually becomes depressed and purposeless with no hero to fight.

Megamind decides to blow up the Metro Man museum to forget the hero, but sees Roxanne there and dehydrates the museum's curator, Bernard, into a small cube. Disguised as Bernard using hologram technology, Megamind talks to Roxanne, whose remarks inspire him to use Metro Man's DNA to create a new superhero to fight. Megamind perfects the formula, but accidentally injects it into Hal Stewart, Roxanne's dimwitted cameraman who is infatuated with her.

Disguising himself via hologram as Hal's "Space Dad", Megamind offers to train Hal to become a superhero. Hal, seeing this as a chance to get with Roxanne, accepts and takes on the name "Titan", though he misspells it as "Tighten". Megamind begins to date Roxanne in the guise of Bernard, and he and Minion have a falling out over Megamind's apparent lack of interest in committing further crimes. Roxanne rejects Tighten when he comes to court her, and Tighten later witnesses her on a date with "Bernard". After a heartbroken Tighten leaves, Megamind's "Bernard" disguise fails, and Roxanne rejects him as well.

Megamind arranges to fight Tighten the next day, but Tighten does not show up. Megamind learns that Tighten is now using his powers on a crime spree. Tighten offers to ally with Megamind, but the latter deliberately reveals his disguises and deceptions, hoping to goad Tighten into fighting. Angered, Tighten savagely beats Megamind in the fight. Realizing that Tighten has no interest in justice and means to kill him, Megamind traps Tighten in a ball of copper. However, Tighten easily breaks out. Megamind and Roxanne escape to Metro Man's old hideout, and discover that Metro Man is still alive, having faked his weakness and death to pursue his dream as a musician. Megamind and Roxanne attempt to enlist his help against Tighten, but he refuses to help. Metro Man tries to encourage Megamind to become the new hero by telling him that a hero will always rise to defeat evil.

Dejected, Megamind willingly returns to prison. Tighten goes on a rampage, and kidnaps Roxanne when she tries to reason with him. On a televised message, Tighten holds Roxanne hostage and demands that Megamind fight him. With Minion's help, Megamind escapes prison, where he goes to confront Tighten, using holographic disguises to make himself appear as Metro Man, and Minion as Megamind, to frighten Tighten away and rescue Roxanne. However, Megamind's speech patterns give him away, and Tighten attacks Megamind, throwing him into the stratosphere. Dehydrating himself into a cube and landing safely in a fountain, Megamind rehydrates next to Tighten and extracts the DNA from him, removing his powers. After Hal is arrested, Megamind and Roxanne rekindle their relationship, while the city celebrates Megamind as their new hero. The museum is rebuilt in Megamind's honor, and a disguised Metro Man cheers for him at the grand opening ceremony.

In a mid-credits scene, Minion discovers the real Bernard has been rehydrated in the washing machine. Bernard complains it has been the worst day of his life, before Minion knocks him out with his forget-me stick.

Cast

 Will Ferrell as Megamind, a blue-skinned, humanoid alien supervillain with a large cranium. He is a spoof of Lex Luthor and Brainiac while his "Space Dad" persona is a parody of both the physical resemblance of Jor-El as played by Marlon Brando in the 1978 film Superman and Brando's voice as Vito Corleone in The Godfather. The home release commentary notes that his costume and showmanship are purposely evocative of Alice Cooper.
 Brad Pitt as Metro Man, Megamind's former nemesis who would rather pursue a career in music. He is a spoof of Superman. The home release commentary notes that his costume and showmanship are purposely evocative of Elvis Presley.
 Tina Fey as Roxanne Ritchi, a TV news reporter who becomes Megamind's love interest. She is a spoof of Lois Lane.
 Jonah Hill as Hal Stewart / Tighten, Roxanne's hapless, dimwitted but nerdy cameraman who has unrequited feelings for her. Given powers by Megamind to become a superhero named Titan (mistaken as "Tighten" by Hal), he instead becomes a supervillain. His name is in reference to Hal Jordan and John Stewart of the Green Lantern Corps.
 David Cross as Minion, a talking fish who has been Megamind's sidekick and best friend since childhood. His costume is evocative of Ro-Man from Robot Monster.
 J. K. Simmons as The Warden, the head of Metro City Prison.
 Ben Stiller as Bernard, a museum curator whom Megamind impersonates to win Roxanne's affections.
 Christopher Knights as Prison Guard
 Tom McGrath as Lord Scott / Prison Guard
 Jack Blessing as Newscaster
 Justin Theroux and Jessica Schulte as Megamind's parents
 Rob Corddry as Random Citizen

Production

The film was written by Alan J. Schoolcraft and Brent Simons. It was first titled Master Mind, and then Oobermind. It was originally suggested that Ben Stiller would be cast as Megamind, and later Robert Downey Jr. but Will Ferrell was ultimately given the role, due to "scheduling conflicts" for Downey. Although Stiller was instead cast in a minor role as the curator named Bernard. Lara Breay and Denise Nolan Cascino were the film's producers, and Stiller and Stuart Cornfeld were the executive producers. Justin Theroux and Guillermo del Toro worked as creative consultants on the film. Del Toro only came on board three weeks before the end of production, but went on to have a more substantial role in subsequent DreamWorks Animation films. The opening of the film, where Megamind is falling to his apparent death, was del Toro's idea.

Music

Megamind: Music from the Motion Picture is a soundtrack to the film of the same name, composed by Hans Zimmer and Lorne Balfe, and released on November 2, 2010, by Lakeshore Records.
Guns N' Roses' Welcome to the Jungle was also used in the scene where Megamind and Tighten have their last battle.

Release

Theatrical
Megamind premiered on October 28, 2010, in Russia, and was theatrically released in the United States on November 5, 2010. It was supposed to be released in Japan on March 12, 2011, but because of the earthquake and tsunami a day before, the Japanese release was cancelled.

Marketing
Megamind was promoted at the 2010 San Diego Comic-Con International, with Tom McGrath, Tina Fey, Jonah Hill, and Will Ferrell, who was dressed as Megamind.

Home media
It was released on both Blu-ray Disc and DVD on February 25, 2011, accompanied with an all-new short titled Megamind: The Button of Doom. The Button of Doom also had its television premiere on Nickelodeon, which was aired on February 26, 2011. It was the seventh-best-selling DVD of 2011 with over 3 million units sold. The film made a total of $70.4 million in DVD and Blu-ray sales. As of November 2012, 5.6 million home entertainment units were sold worldwide.

The film was released on Blu-ray 3D in March 2011 exclusively as a part of Samsung 3D Starter Kits, and on September 11, 2011, exclusively at Best Buy stores. In 2014, the film's distribution rights were purchased by DreamWorks Animation from Paramount Pictures and transferred to 20th Century Fox; the rights are now owned by Universal Pictures.

Reception

Box office
Megamind opened to $12.5 million on opening day, and earned $46 million over the three-day weekend, taking the No. 1 spot, averaging $11,668 from around 7,300 screens at 3,944 theaters.  The opening was a bit higher than fellow DreamWorks Animation film How to Train Your Dragon, which earned $43.7 million back in March 2010. It was the fifth-highest opening for an animated feature in 2010. In its second weekend, it repeated at No. 1 and dropped 37% to $29.1 million for a $7,374 average from 3,949 theaters, and bringing its 10-day cumulative total to $88.8 million. On its third weekend, it fell 45% to $16 million and finished second to Harry Potter and the Deathly Hallows – Part 1, averaging $4,237 from 3,779 theaters. Over Thanksgiving weekend, it held well with just a 22% drop to $12.6 million and slid to third place behind Harry Potter and the Deathly Hallows – Part 1 and Tangled (it earned $17.3 million over the five-day Thanksgiving period). Following Thanksgiving, the film fell a sharp 61% in its fifth weekend to $4.9 million and finished in sixth place.

The film closed in theaters on February 24, 2011 (a day before it was released on DVD and Blu-ray), earning $148.4 million in North America, and $173.5 million in other countries, for a worldwide total of $321.9 million. It is the sixth-highest-grossing animated film from 2010 worldwide, behind Toy Story 3 ($1.063 billion), Shrek Forever After ($753 million), Tangled ($591 million), Despicable Me ($543 million), and How to Train Your Dragon ($494 million), the highest-grossing film worldwide in both Ferrell's (until 2014's The Lego Movie) and Fey's careers, as well as the fifth-highest-grossing computer-animated superhero film, behind Incredibles 2, The Incredibles, Big Hero 6 and Spider-Man: Into the Spider-Verse.

Critical response
The site's consensus states, "It regurgitates plot points from earlier animated efforts, and isn't quite as funny as it should be, but a top-shelf voice cast and strong visuals help make Megamind a pleasant, if unspectacular, diversion." On Metacritic the film has a weighted average score of 63 out of 100 based on reviews from 33 critics, indicating "generally favorable reviews". Audiences polled by CinemaScore gave the film an average grade of "A−" on an A+ to F scale.

Roger Ebert of the Chicago Sun-Times gave the film three stars out of four, stating, "This set-up is bright and amusing, even if it does feel recycled from bits and pieces of such recent animated landmarks as The Incredibles with its superpowers and Despicable Me with its villain." Stephen Holden, of The New York Times, positively wrote in his review, "Visually Megamind is immaculately sleek and gracefully enhanced by 3-D." Entertainment Weekly reviewer Owen Gleiberman graded the film a B+ and wrote, "...too goofy-surreal to pack a lot of emotional punch, but it's antically light on its feet, with 3-D images that have a lustrous, gizmo-mad sci-fi clarity." Peter Travers of Rolling Stone commented, "What this raucous 3D animated fun house lacks in originality (think bastard child of The Incredibles and Despicable Me) it makes up for in visual and vocal wit." Betsy Sharkey of the Los Angeles Times wrote, "Just as Megamind struggles to find his center, at times, so does the film."

The main point of criticism was the film's perceived lack of originality. Michael Phillips of the Chicago Tribune wrote: "You have seen all this before". Justin Chang of Variety said: "Though enlivened by some moderately clever twists on the superhero-movie template, Megamind never shakes off a feeling of been-there-spoofed-that." Claudia Puig of USA Today even asked: "Do we really need Megamind when Despicable Me is around?".

Accolades

Video games
Several video game tie-ins published by THQ were released on November 2, 2010, to coincide with the film's release. An Xbox 360 and PlayStation 3 version is titled Megamind: Ultimate Showdown, while the Wii version is titled Megamind: Mega Team Unite and the PlayStation Portable and Nintendo DS versions are both titled Megamind: The Blue Defender.

Megamind: The Button of Doom
Megamind: The Button of Doom is a 2011 computer animated short film released on DVD/Blu-ray with Megamind on February 25, 2011, directed by Simon J. Smith and stars Will Ferrell and David Cross with a story by the original writers of the film. Produced by DreamWorks Animation, the short sets after the events of the film to show off Megamind's first day as Defender of Metro City.

Plot
Following the events of the feature film, Megamind and Minion have assumed the challenging role of Protectors of Metro City. They begin by selling off their old gadgets from their former evil lair, as Megamind does not think heroes should use devices associated with evil. All of the items are sold, except for the Death Ray, which Megamind reluctantly keeps. As for the De-Gun, Megamind's former favorite weapon, it gets sold to a boy named Damien, who accidentally uses it to dehydrate his mother into a cube. After the auction is over, Megamind reveals a supersuit he created, which copies all of Metro Man's powers and which he intends to wear and defend the city.

Minion finds a stray box with a button on it that he was also unable to sell during the auction. Not remembering what the button does, Megamind pushes it, activating an AI program based on his former evil personality that transfers itself into a giant robot called the Mega-Megamind. After scanning the supersuit, the robot thinks that Megamind is Metro Man and starts attacking him. Megamind fights the Mega-Megamind with his new powers, but is unfamiliar with their use. The Mega-Megamind causes Megamind to crash-land in his own lair. Megamind and Minion hide in the Invisible Car, and Megamind fears they will have to stay there forever, as he programmed the AI to not stop until the hero is dead. Minion suggests that Megamind should stop trying to be Metro Man, and fight the robot in his own way. He also reveals he secretly kept their giant Spider-Bot, having grown fond of it as a pet.

Megamind thanks Minion, and plans to lure the Mega-Megamind to the abandoned observatory in which the real Metro Man faked his death. Megamind, riding the Spider-Bot, succeeds in luring the Mega-Megamind to the spot, but Minion cannot activate the Death Ray because its main controls were smashed by Megamind's suit when he crash-landed. Megamind has Minion test the contents of a box of old secondary remotes to find the one for the Death Ray. Minion does so, and activates several features in the lair and on the Spider-Bot in the process, allowing the Mega-Megamind to capture the Spider-Bot. Finally finding the correct remote, Minion blasts the giant robot with the ray just as Megamind uses the robot's own arm-mounted crossbow to launch himself and the Spider-Bot to safety.

Megamind and Minion subsequently recover their old gadgets and re-purpose them for good. Upon finding Damien and the De-Gun, they discover he has dehydrated the parents of several other children as well as his own, and he and the children are throwing a party to celebrate their new freedom. Megamind reclaims the De-Gun, and re-hydrates the parents with a glass of water, much to the children's dismay. Later, Megamind and Minion see a signal in the sky (a spoof of the Bat-Signal) and ride off in the Invisible Car as they are called to action.

Cast
 Will Ferrell as Megamind and Mega-Megamind
 David Cross as Minion, Megamind's assistant
 Michelle Belforte Hauser as Concerned Mother
 Jordan Alexander Hauser as Damien
 Kevin N. Bailey as Kevin
 Dante James Hauser as Nigel
 Declan James Swift as Peter
 Fintan Thomas Swift as Barney

Release
The short film was released on DVD/Blu-ray with Megamind on February 25, 2011. The Button of Doom also had its television premiere on Nickelodeon, which was aired on February 26, 2011, and on Cartoon Network, which was aired on September 5, 2022.

Television series 
On February 11, 2022, it was announced that Peacock had ordered a CG animated series from DreamWorks Animation Television serving as a follow up to the film, originally titled Megamind’s Guide To Defending Your City. As of May 6, 2022, the cast and format have not been revealed. The series will chronicle the new hero's quest to become a social media influencer and a true superhero. The original writers of the film, Alan Schoolcraft and Brent Simons, are signed on as executive producers with Celebrity Deathmatch creator Eric Fogel. JD Ryznar will be co-executive producer and story editor.

On August 5, 2022, Simons confirmed that the show's writing was completed and production was moving forward. The series will be released in 2024.

References

External links

 
 Megamind interactive trailer
 
 
 
 
 
 

 
2010 films
2010 3D films
2010 animated films
2010 computer-animated films
2010s American animated films
2010s crime comedy films
2010s science fiction comedy films
2010s animated superhero films
American children's animated action films
American children's animated comic science fiction films
American children's animated superhero films
American computer-animated films
American crime comedy films
IMAX films
Film and television memes
Internet memes
2010s superhero comedy films
Supervillain films
Film superheroes
Films set on fictional planets
DreamWorks Animation animated films
Paramount Pictures animated films
Paramount Pictures films
Films scored by Hans Zimmer
Films scored by Lorne Balfe
Films directed by Tom McGrath
3D animated films
Parodies of Superman
2010 comedy films
2010s English-language films